AlphaGalileo is a business-to-business science news service launched in 1998. AlphaGalileo was created as a result of UK government efforts to promote public engagement with science.

The news service, which is moderated, is run by the independent organisation, AlphaGalileo Ltd. It takes press releases about research developments from over 2 000 contributors and distributes them to more than 7,000 journalists in some 85 countries.

The service was founded in 1998 by Peter Green with the support of the Association of British Science Writers as well as support from the French and German ministries.

References

External links
Official website

British news websites
Multilingual websites
British science websites
Internet properties established in 1998
1998 establishments in the United Kingdom